"Welcome Home" is a song made popular by Peters and Lee.

Originally written by Jean Alphonse Dupre and Stanislas Beldone in French and translated into English by Bryan Blackburn, the record was produced by Johnny Franz. Coming after their success in the talent show Opportunity Knocks, Peters and Lee recorded "Welcome Home", which became the duo's only number one single in the UK Singles Chart, spending a week at the top in July 1973. It went on to sell over 800,000 copies in the UK.

The song received minor US crossover, appearing on Billboard's Bubbling Under The Hot 100, Country charts, and most notably on the Easy Listening chart, where it peaked at number twenty-six.

Charts

Popular culture
The song was used in an advertising campaign by Walkers Crisps when Gary Lineker returned to the UK after playing abroad.

References

UK Singles Chart number-one singles
Irish Singles Chart number-one singles
1973 singles
1973 songs
Song recordings produced by Johnny Franz
Male–female vocal duets